Hugh Butler (17 March 1875 – 19 May 1939) was a Scottish amateur footballer who played as an inside right in the Scottish League for Queen's Park.

Personal life 
Butler worked as an iron manufacturer's clerk. He served as a private in the Cameronians (Scottish Rifles) and the King's Own Yorkshire Light Infantry during the First World War.

Career statistics

References 

1875 births
Scottish footballers
Scottish Football League players
British Army personnel of World War I
Cameronians soldiers
Association football inside forwards
Queen's Park F.C. players
King's Own Yorkshire Light Infantry soldiers
Footballers from Glasgow
1939 deaths